The ML-63 is a submachine gun manufactured by the Buenos Aires-based Halcon corporation.

Overview
The ML-63 is chambered in 9mm Parabellum and is fed from a 30-round magazine. The ML-63 also came with a fixed wooden stock, which appears to be based primarily on the MAT-49 Submachine Gun. An integrally suppressed version was also made. A number of ML-63 submachine guns were found by the British during the Falklands War in 1982.

References

External links
www.defenseonline.com.cn
www.renar.gov.ar
cartuchosfm.es.tl
www.zonamilitar.com.ar
tocha-mercenario-fire.blogspot.com

9mm Parabellum submachine guns
Submachine guns of Argentina
Fábrica de Armas Halcón firearms
Military equipment introduced in the 1950s